Nalapanima is a musical play (Geeti Natak) about the patriotism of a Nepalese soldier during the Battle of Nalapani in 1814 in the Anglo-Nepalese War, fought under the command of Balbhadra Kunwar. Lyrics were written by Bala Krishna ‘Sama’ and music composed by Shiva Shankar.

Synopsis 
A wounded Nepalese soldier sought help from the British camp. He was grateful for the humanitarian help from the British but defied an offer to join British army (Gurkha War).

Production 
The Drama was staged at the Rastriya Nachghar (Nepal). After few years the drama was re-edited by Deepak Jangam and staged again. The show's songs blend traditional Nepalese folk music and more contemporary music. The album also contains some duet songs sung by Narayan Gopal and his mentor Manik Ratna.

Songs
 Piyo..., piyo:   (Narayan Gopal and Manik Ratna)
 Ke har khai Ayewu:  (Shiva Shankar and Narayan Gopal)
 Chora naro: (Kamala Shrestha)
 Haye mero pritam: (Kamala Shrestha)
 Awu awau relimai: (Manik Ratna)
 Ama timilai: (Narayan Gopal)
 Chomoluma shikhara:  (Shiva Shankar and Kamala Shrestha)
 Agalagi nibhawunu paryo: (Manik Ratna)
 Aye.. Ayen: (Manik Ratna)
 Najawu murkha bhai: (Narayan Gopal)
 Jana dewu aba: (Manik Ratna)
 Huncha huncha: (Narayan Gopal and Manik Ratna)

References

Anglo-Nepalese War
Musicals inspired by real-life events
Nepal in fiction
Plays set in the 19th century
Plays set in Asia
Works about wars